Mohammad Ghouse (15 March 1931 – 29 September 2014) was a cricket umpire known for umpiring Test and One Day International matches. He is the former Chairman of Tamil Nadu Cricket Association and the ex President of Tamil Nadu Umpires Guild, also having served as a Match Referee.

Early life 
Ghouse was born in Chennai, India, formerly Madras. His Father's name was Mohammed Ibrahim. He studied in the prestigious Loyola College, Chennai and worked in the Postal Department of India. His profound interest in the game of cricket prompted him to become a test umpire and later on,a match referee.

Career 
Ghouse umpired two One Day International matches which included India v West Indies at Srinagar on 13 October 1983 and India v England at Pune on 5 December 1984. Of the 8 Test matches he umpired, India won 4,lost 0,and 4 matches resulted in a draw. He also umpired many interstate tournaments. Ghouse made his first-class debut as an umpire in a Ranji Trophy match in 1968-69 and went on to officiate more than 18 seasons. His first Test as an official was in his hometown, between India and New Zealand in 1975-76.

After his umpiring career ended in 1985-86, he became a match referee and was active till 2001-02. Ghouse also served as the chairman of the umpire’s subcommittee of the Tamil Nadu Cricket Association.

List of Test matches umpired by Mohammed Ghouse

Death
Ghouse died on the morning of 29 September 2014 following a brief illness. He was 83. He is survived by his wife, son and three daughters. On behalf of Tamil Nadu Cricket Association members, president N. Srinivasan expressed "profound sorrow and grief" at his demise.

See also
 List of Test cricket umpires
 List of One Day International cricket umpires

External links 
 Mohammed Ghouse at Cricinfo.com
http://www.espncricinfo.com/india/content/story/785789.html
http://www.thehindu.com/sport/cricket/umpire-ghouse-passes-away/article6458765.ece
http://www.wisdenindia.com/news-brief/ghouse-ex-umpire-passes/128780

1931 births
2014 deaths
Indian Test cricket umpires
Indian One Day International cricket umpires